National Petroleum Authority (NPA) is a statutory body set up by the Government of Ghana to regulate, oversee and monitor the Ghanaian petroleum industry. The authority was established after calls by the general public for efficiency, growth and stakeholder satisfaction in the industry. Hassan Tampuli currently heads the NPA.

History
The authority was set up by Legislative Instrument of the Parliament of Ghana and it is powered by NPA Act of 2005. It is also known as ACT 691. The authority is headquartered in Accra.

Functions
The regulatory mission of the NPA allows it to regularly monitor and adjust the price of Petroleum products in Ghana.

References

Ministries and Agencies of State of Ghana
Petroleum organizations
Energy in Ghana
Energy regulatory authorities
Regulation in Ghana